The Nordic Cup is a rugby league tournament played annually between Denmark national rugby league team, Norway and Sweden.  It was first played in 2011, in which Denmark claimed the trophy with victory over Norway at Gladsaxe Stadium in Greater Copenhagen.  For the first three years, the tournament was acknowledged by the Rugby League European Federation (RLEF), but the games were not recognised as full internationals.  In 2014, the fixtures were played in accordance with RLEF regulations and recognised as full internationals.

Nordic Cup 2017

(ranking in square brackets)

Norway [#18] 38–18 Sweden #[20] (Bislett Stadion, Oslo, Norway, 17 June 2017)

Denmark [#17] 24–46 Norway [#18] (Roskilde, Denmark, 19 August 2017)

Sweden [#20] v Denmark [#17] (16 September 2017 - match postponed)

Nordic Cup 2016
Denmark was unable to fulfil its commitment in its game against Norway, so they had to forfeit the match and the title it held.

Sweden 24-40 Norway (Stockholm, 16 July 2016)

Denmark 50-18 Sweden (Copenhagen, 7 August 2016)

Nordic Cup 2015
The final game between Norway and Sweden in Oslo was played in October 2015, rather than the summer.

Sweden 16-30 Denmark (Lund, 24 May 2015)

Denmark 24-12 Norway (Roskilde, 13 June 2015)

Norway 30-20 Sweden (Oslo, 17 October 2015)

Results
Denmark have traditionally been the strongest team, winning three (2011, 2014, 2015) of the six competitions.  Norway have also won three (2012, 2016, 2017) and Sweden once (2013). 2016 was decided through Denmark not being able to fulfil its match with Norway.

Winners

References

Rugby league in Denmark
Rugby league in Norway
Rugby league in Sweden
Rugby league international tournaments
European rugby league competitions
Inter-Nordic sports competitions